Georgi Hashev (born 26 March 1990) is a Bulgarian professional footballer who plays as a defender.

Career
On 25 January 2017, Hashev signed with Neftochimic but had to leave the club in June following the relegation to the Second League. On 25 June 2017, he joined Tsarsko Selo.

Awards
 Champion of B PFG 2013 (with Neftochimic Burgas)

References

External links
 
 

1990 births
Living people
Sportspeople from Stara Zagora
Bulgarian footballers
First Professional Football League (Bulgaria) players
Second Professional Football League (Bulgaria) players
PFC Beroe Stara Zagora players
OFC Sliven 2000 players
Neftochimic Burgas players
FC Sozopol players
FC Tsarsko Selo Sofia players
Association football defenders